The 2021–22 Holy Cross Crusaders men's basketball team represented the College of the Holy Cross in the 2021–22 NCAA Division I men's basketball season. The Crusaders, led by third-year head coach Brett Nelson, played their home games at the Hart Center in Worcester, Massachusetts as members of the Patriot League.

Previous season 
In a season limited due to the ongoing COVID-19 pandemic, the Crusaders finished the 2020–21 season 5–11 in Patriot League play before suspending their season after positive COVID-19 tests within the program. They did not participate in the Patriot League tournament.

Roster

Schedule and results 

|-
!colspan=9 style=|Non-conference regular season

|-
!colspan=9 style=|Patriot League regular season

|-
!colspan=9 style=|Patriot League Tournament

|-

References 

Holy Cross Crusaders men's basketball seasons
Holy Cross
Holy Cross Crusaders men's basketball
Holy Cross Crusaders men's basketball